Gillian White may refer to:
 Gillian White (actress) (born 1975), American actress
 Gillian White (lawyer) (1936-2016), English professor of international law
 Gillian White (sculptor) (born 1939), English sculptor based in Switzerland
 Gillian White (writer) (1945-2020), English novelist and journalist